Marcelo Alejandro Lamas (born 28 February 1986) is an Argentine professional footballer who plays as a midfielder for Defensores de Belgrano.

Career
Lamas' career began with Vélez Sarsfield, who loaned him out to Estudiantes. In 2008, Lamas joined Almirante Brown. He scored one goal, against Defensores de Belgrano on 29 September 2008, in eighteen matches during 2008–09. San Telmo signed Lamas in June 2009, with the midfielder subsequently featuring in fifty-three fixtures and netting once across two years with the club. Comunicaciones became Lamas' fifth club in 2011, prior to a move to Crucero del Norte. They won promotion in his second year, which led to Lamas making his first appearance in the Argentine Primera División on 14 February 2015 versus Tigre.

On 4 January 2016, following forty-five matches for Crucero del Norte, Lamas departed to sign for Torneo Federal A's Gimnasia y Esgrima. His stint lasted six months, with Omar Labruna only selecting him in five matches. Lamas subsequently spent the 2016–17 Primera B Metropolitana season with ex-club Estudiantes, netting goals against Fénix and Excursionistas as the club finished sixth - losing in the promotion play-offs to Lamas' old team Comunicaciones. August 2017 saw Lamas join Primera B Nacional side Brown. His opening appearance for them arrived in an away victory versus Almagro on 16 September.

Career statistics
.

References

External links

1986 births
Living people
Footballers from Buenos Aires
Argentine footballers
Association football midfielders
Primera B Metropolitana players
Primera Nacional players
Argentine Primera División players
Torneo Federal A players
Club Almirante Brown footballers
San Telmo footballers
Club Comunicaciones footballers
Crucero del Norte footballers
Gimnasia y Esgrima de Mendoza footballers
Estudiantes de Buenos Aires footballers
Club Atlético Brown footballers
Defensores de Belgrano footballers